James Francis Patterson (8 May 1919 – 13 January 1994) was an Australian rules footballer who played with North Melbourne in the Victorian Football League (VFL).

Patterson enlisted in the Royal Australian Navy in 1936, aged 17, and served for a total of 12 years, including all of World War II. It was during his service with the Army that he played a total of 25 games with North Melbourne across four seasons.

Patterson subsequently played for Sandringham for two years before returning to Western Australia where he played a solitary game for Perth in the West Australian Football League.

Notes

External links 

Jim Patterson's playing statistics from The VFA Project

1919 births
1994 deaths
Australian rules footballers from Victoria (Australia)
North Melbourne Football Club players
Sandringham Football Club players
Perth Football Club players
Royal Australian Navy personnel of World War II
Royal Australian Navy sailors